Declan is an Irish given name, an anglicised form of the Irish saint name Declán, also Deaglán or Déaglán. St. Declán founded a monastery in Ireland in the 5th century, and the St. Declán's stone has been credited as the site of many miracles. The name is believed to mean "man of prayer" or "full of goodness".

Notable people with the given name "Declan" include

A
Declan Affley (1939–1985), Australian singer
Declan Arthurs (1965–1987), Northern Irish soldier

B
Declan Barron (born 1951), Irish Gaelic footballer
Declan Bennett (born 1981), English singer-songwriter
Declan Bonner (born 1965), Irish Gaelic footballer
Declan Brady, Irish criminal
Declan Breathnach (born 1958), Irish politician
Declan Bree (born 1978), Irish Gaelic footballer
Declan Browne (born 1958), Irish politician
Declan Buckley, Irish television personality
Declan Buckley (designer), British landscape designer
Declan Burke (born 1972), British guitarist
Declan Burns (born 1956), Irish canoer

C
Declan Carr (born 1965), Irish hurler
Declan Casey (born 2000), Australian rugby league footballer
Declan Cassidy, Irish film director
Declan Chisholm (born 2000), Canadian ice hockey player
Declan Costello (1926–2011), Irish politician
Declan Coulter (born 1987/1988), Irish hurler
Declan Cross (born 1993), Canadian football player
Declan Curran (born 1952), Australian rugby union footballer
Declan Curry (born 1971), Irish journalist
Declan Cusack (born 1988), Irish rugby union footballer

D
Declan Dale, (born 1973), American filmmaker
Declan Dalton (born 1997), Irish hurler
Declan Danaher (born 1980), English rugby union player
Declan Darcy, Irish Gaelic footballer
Declan de Barra (born 1960), Irish musician
Declan Devine (born 1973), Northern Irish footballer
Declan Donnellan (born 1953), British theatre director
Declan Donnelly (born 1975), English television presenter
Declan Drysdale (born 1999), English footballer
Declan Dunn (born 2000), English footballer

E
Declan Edge (born 1965), Malaysian footballer
Declan Edwards (born 1989), Irish footballer

F
Declan Fanning (born 1979), Irish Gaelic footballer and hurler
Declan Farmer (born 1997), American ice sledge hockey player
Declan Feenan (born 1980), Irish playwright
Declan Fitzpatrick (born 1983), Irish rugby union footballer
Declan Flynn (1951–1982), Irish social figure
Declan Fogarty (born 1960), Irish sportsperson
Declan Fraser (born 2000), Australian auto racing driver
Declan Frith (born 2002), English footballer

G
Declan Galbraith (born 1991), English singer
Declan Gallagher (born 1991), Scottish footballer
Declan Ganley (born 1968), Irish businessman and political activist
Declan Glass (born 2000), Scottish footballer

H
Declan Hannon (born 1992), Irish hurler
Declan Harvey, British journalist
Declan Hegarty (born 1992), Irish hammer thrower
Declan Hill, Canadian journalist
Declan Hughes (disambiguation), multiple people
Declan Hulme (born 1993), Irish novelist
Declan Hutchings, English footballer

J
Declan James (born 1993), British squash player
Declan John (born 1995), Welsh footballer
Declan Jones (born 1995), British racing driver

K
Declan Kearney (born 1964), Irish politician
Declan Keilty (born 1995), Australian rules footballer
Declan Kelly (disambiguation), multiple people
Declan Kennedy (born 1934), Irish architect
Declan Kiberd (born 1951), Irish writer and scholar
Declan Kidney (born 1959), Irish rugby union coach

L
Declan Michael Laird (born 1993), Scottish actor
Declan Lally, Irish Gaelic footballer
Declan Lambert (born 1998), Malaysian footballer
Declan Lang (born 1950), English prelate
Declan Lonergan (born 1969), Irish cyclist
Declan Long (born 1950), Irish art critic and lecturer
Declan Lowney (born 1960), Irish  film director
Declan Lynch (born 1961), Irish journalist
Declan Lynch (Gaelic footballer) (born 1992), Irish Gaelic footballer

M
Declan Marmion (born 1961), Irish priest
Declan Masterson, Irish musician
Declan Maxwell (born 1980/1981), Irish Gaelic footballer
Declan McAleer (born 1973), Irish politician
Declan McCavana (born 1963), Northern Irish professor
Declan McCullagh, American journalist
Declan McDaid (born 1995), Scottish footballer
Declan McDonnell (born 1948), Irish politician
Declan McDonogh (born 1989), Irish jockey
Declan McGonagle (born 1953), Irish art curator
Declan McKenna (born 1998), British singer-songwriter
Declan McManus (born 1994), Scottish footballer
Declan Meagher (1921–2019), Irish obstetrician
Declan Meehan (disambiguation), multiple people
Declan Moore (disambiguation), multiple people
Declan Morgan (born 1952), Northern Irish judge
Declan Mountford (born 1997), Australian rules footballer
Declan Mulholland (1932–1999), Irish actor
Declan Mulligan (1938–2021), Irish singer-songwriter
Declan Murphy (disambiguation), multiple people

N
Declan Nash (born 1966), Irish sportsperson
Declan Nerney (born 1959), Irish singer-songwriter

O
Declan O'Brien (1965–2022), American writer and director
Declan O'Brien (footballer) (born 1979), Irish footballer
Declan O'Donnell (born 1990), New Zealand rugby sevens footballer
Declan O'Dwyer (disambiguation), multiple people
Declan O'Keeffe (born 1972), Irish sportsperson
Declan O'Loan (born 1951), Irish politician
Declan O'Mahony, Irish Gaelic footballer
Declan O'Rourke (born 1976), Irish singer-songwriter
Declan O'Sullivan (born 1983), Irish sportsperson

P
Declan Patton (born 1995), English rugby league footballer
Declan Perkins (born 1975), English footballer
Declan Pilkington (born 1969), Irish hurler
Declan Power, Irish soldier
Declan Prendergast (born 1981), Irish hurler

Q
Declan Qualter, Irish hurler
Declan Quigley, Irish broadcaster and journalist
Declan Quill, Irish Gaelic footballer
Declan Quinn (born 1957), American cinematographer

R
Declan Rice (born 1999), English footballer
Declan Rooney (born 1983/1984), Irish Gaelic footballer
Declan Rudd (born 1991), English footballer
Declan Ruth (born 1976), Irish hurler
Declan Ryan (disambiguation), multiple people

S
Declan Shalvey, Irish comic book artist
Declan Sinnott (born 1950), Irish musician
Declan Smith (born 1997), Welsh rugby union footballer

T
Declan Thompson (born 2002), English footballer
Declan Tingay (born 1999), Australian racewalker

W
Declan Walsh (born 1989), Irish Gaelic footballer
Declan Walsh (journalist), Irish journalist

Fictional characters
Declan Macey, a character on the British soap opera Emmerdale
Declan Napier, a character on the Australian soap opera Neighbours
Declan O'Callaghan, the male lead of Leap Year (2010 film)
Declan Mulqueen, the Irish character portrayed by Richard Gere in the film The Jackal (1997 film)

See also
Declan (disambiguation), a disambiguation page for "Declan"

Irish masculine given names